Åke Lindström (22 July 1928 – 26 December 2002) was a Swedish actor and film director. He appeared in more than 40 films and television shows between 1950 and 2001.

Selected filmography
 The Kiss on the Cruise (1950)
 Storm Over Tjurö (1954)
 Salka Valka (1954)
 The Song of the Scarlet Flower (1956)
 A Goat in the Garden (1958)
 The Judge (1960)
 Lovely Is the Summer Night (1961)
 Badarna (1968)
 The Corridor (1968)
 The Touch (1971)
 Pistol (1973)
 The Last Adventure (1974)
 David and the Magic Pearl (1988)
 The Little Mermaid (1989)

References

External links

1928 births
2002 deaths
20th-century Swedish male actors
Swedish male film actors
Swedish male television actors
Swedish film directors
People from Söderhamn